Colobothea sordida is a species of beetle in the family Cerambycidae. It was described by Per Olof Christopher Aurivillius in 1902. It is known from Brazil, Peru, and Ecuador.

References

sordida
Beetles described in 1902